A prison cemetery is a graveyard reserved for the dead bodies of prisoners.  Generally, the remains of inmates who are not claimed by family or friends are interred in prison cemeteries and include convicts executed for capital crimes.

List of prison cemeteries
 United States
 Florida
Union Correctional Institution, Raiford
Kansas
 Fort Leavenworth Military Prison Cemetery
 Louisiana
 Point Lookout Cemetery and Point Lookout II, Louisiana State Penitentiary (Angola), West Feliciana Parish
 One cemetery at the Elayn Hunt Correctional Center, St. Gabriel
 Mississippi
 2 cemeteries, Mississippi State Penitentiary (Parchman), Sunflower County, Mississippi
 South Carolina
 State Cemetery, a.k.a. Penitentiary Cemetery (nicknamed "Tickleberry"), Central Correctional Institution (Columbia), Richland County, South Carolina
 Texas
 Captain Joe Byrd Cemetery, Huntsville (the unclaimed remains of inmates who were executed for capital murder are buried here, but the cemetery also includes the remains of non-executed inmates)
 One cemetery, Clemens Unit, Brazoria County, Texas
 Imperial State Farm Cemetery, Central Unit, Sugar Land
 Gatesville State School, Gatesville

References

Cemeteries
Prisons